Francis Nicolay (born 23 April 1944) is a Belgian footballer. He played in one match for the Belgium national football team in 1974.

References

External links
 

1944 births
2002 deaths
Belgian footballers
Belgium international footballers
Place of birth missing
Association football midfielders